Gurrola is a Basque surname from Biscay. Notable people with the surname include:

Alberto Gurrola (1993–2022), Mexican footballer
Eva Gurrola (born 1994), Mexican weightlifter
José Gurrola (born 1998), Mexican footballer 

Basque-language surnames